Mišnjak is the name of several uninhabited islets in the Croatian part of the Adriatic Sea:

Mišnjak (Rab), near the island of Rab
Mišnjak (Šipan), near the island of Šipan in the Elaphiti Islands archipelago
Mišnjak (Ugljan), near the island of Ugljan in the Zadar Archipelago
Mišnjak (Unije), near the island of Unije in the Cres-Lošinj archipelago